Mannar Island, formerly spelt Manar Island, which lies off the north-western coast of Sri Lanka, is part of Mannar District, Sri Lanka. It is linked to the main island of Sri Lanka by a causeway and the Mannar Bridge, which carries the A14 highway, and a railway bridge.

Etymology
In the Tamil language Mannar means the raised place [of sand] which is though to have come from the geology of the island which was formed by the accumulation of sand.

History
Scholars identify the old Sinhalese name "Mahapatan-ju which is mentioned in Sigiri graffiti as the island of Mannar"

During the Sri Lankan civil war (1983–2009), Muslim inhabitants of the island were forced to leave by the Tamil Tigers, but some have returned since.

Geography

The island lies at the eastern end of Adam's Bridge, a chain of limestone shoals between Pamban Island (also known as Rameswaram Island), off the south-eastern coast of Tamil Nadu, India, and Mannar Island. Geological evidence suggests that this may have been a land connection between India and Sri Lanka.

Fishing is an important part of the economy.

Energy

Largest wind harness in Sri Lanka at present comes from Mannar island by 100 MW Wind Power Plant done by Ceylon Electricity Board. This plant connects to National Grid by 220 kV Inter-connector Grid Substation at Nadukuda. GSS is having provision to connect another 200 MW and the island has more capacity if required in distinct future. Substation construction and installation is done by Minel Lanka  under the main contract by Siemens, India.

Settlements and transport
The main settlements on the island are Mannar and Erukkulampiddi on its eastern coast, and Pesalai on its northern coast, all connected by the A14 road which leads across the bridge to mainland Sri Lanka.

Talaimannar, on the north-western coast of the island, is the terminus for the Mannar railway line.

Between 1914 and 1964, there was a train and ferry link from mainland India via Dhanushkodi and Talaimannar to Colombo, but this was not resumed after the disastrous damage caused by a cyclone in 1964. The Palk Strait bridge was proposed in June 2015, to link mainland India to Mannar.

Environment
The island is home to baobab trees, brought from Africa by Arab merchants centuries ago. The island is within the Central Asian Flyway, a heavily used route for migratory birds, and the Vankalai Bird Sanctuary is just south of the island on the mainland. It is protected by the Sri Lankan Government and is recognised under the Ramsar Convention on Wetlands of International Importance Especially as Waterfowl Habitat as an important area for both local and migratory birds.

The island's ecology, agriculture and fishing areas may be easily damaged by disruption to the environment.

Sand mining
The mineral ilmenite, from which titanium dioxide is made, is plentiful in the islands sand. Titanium dioxide is a white pigment with a variety of uses, including in paint, plastics and cosmetics. The Perth-based  Australian company, Titanium Sands, has been doing exploratory drilling and has estimated reserves of up to 265 million tonnes of ilmenite and have started the process of applying for a permit to mine the sand. However, environmental scientists are concerned about the impact of future drilling on birds and other wildlife. The company has said that an environmental impact assessment, followed by public consultation, would be undertaken before a mining licence can be granted.

See also 
Portuguese invasion of Jaffna kingdom (1560)

References 

Islands of Sri Lanka
Landforms of Mannar District